Edward Baker ( – December 22, 1959) was an American football player and coach. He served as the head football coach at Carnegie Institute of Technology—now known as Carnegie Mellon University—from 1940 to 1942 and from 1949 to 1959. As a college football player, Baker was a three-time letter winner for the University of Pittsburgh. He also played Minor League Baseball. Baker died at the age of 50, on December 22, 1959, at South Side Hospital in Pittsburgh, Pennsylvania, after having has surgery six days earlier for an intestinal obstruction. In additional to coaching, he also practiced dentistry.

Head coaching record

References

External links
 

Year of birth missing
1900s births
1959 deaths
American dentists
American football quarterbacks
Baseball shortstops
Carnegie Mellon Tartans football coaches
Harrisburg Senators players
Hartford Senators players
New Bedford Whalers (baseball) players
Pittsburgh Panthers football coaches
Pittsburgh Panthers football players
20th-century dentists